FC Abuli is a Georgian association football club based in Akhalkalaki which currently competes in Regionuli Liga, the fifth tier of Georgian league system.

History
Established in 2001, Abuli as a municipal club started taking part in Georgian league tournaments after 2009.

After the 2016 transitional season to the Spring-Autumn system the team was relegated from Liga 3. Since then they have been competing in Regionuli Liga.

Recent seasons

Note: *Relegated

Squad
As of 2019

Name
Abuli is a mountain peak situated at 3,301m in the Javakheti region.

References

External Links
Page in Facebook

Football clubs in Georgia (country)